The 2018 Shimadzu All Japan Indoor Tennis Championships was a professional tennis tournament played on carpet indoor. It was the 22nd edition of the tournament which was part of the 2018 ATP Challenger Tour. It took place in Kyoto, Japan between 19 and 25 February 2018.

Singles main draw entrants

Seeds

 1 Rankings are as of 12 February 2018.

Other entrants
The following players received wildcards into the singles main draw:
  Sora Fukuda
  Shintaro Imai
  Yuta Shimizu
  Yosuke Watanuki

The following player received entry into the singles main draw using a protected ranking:
  Michał Przysiężny

The following players received entry from the qualifying draw:
  Blake Ellis
  Takanyi Garanganga
  Yuya Kibi
  Li Zhe

Champions

Singles

 John Millman def.  Jordan Thompson 7–5, 6–1.

Doubles

 Luke Saville /  Jordan Thompson def.  Go Soeda /  Yasutaka Uchiyama 6–3, 5–7, [10–6].

References 

2018 ATP Challenger Tour
2018
2018 in Japanese tennis